The Botswana Gazette is an English language newspaper published in Gaborone, Botswana.

In 2015, the paper's managing editor (Shike Olsen), its editor (Lawrence Seretse), a reporter (Innocent Selatlhwa) and the paper's lawyer (Joao Salbany) were arrested following a raid of their offices by the Directorate on Corruption and Economic Crime.

See also 
 The Voice Botswana
 Botswana Guardian
 Mmegi
 Yarona FM

References

External links

English-language newspapers published in Africa
Newspapers published in Gaborone
Publications with year of establishment missing